Docklands Buses is a bus company operating in East London. It is a subsidiary of the Go-Ahead Group and operates services under contract to Transport for London.

History
Docklands Buses was formed by Harry Blundred's Transit Holdings in 1988 as Docklands Transit. It initially operated local commercial routes using Ford Transit minibuses, but these proved not to be viable so it switched to operating tendered Transport for London services. Stagecoach purchased the bus side of the company in 1997, and Docklands Transit continued operating private hire vehicles. In 2002, Docklands Buses commenced operating route 167, soon winning other contracts.

In September 2006 the company was purchased by the Go-Ahead Group. In August 2008, Go-Ahead's London bus operations all adopted the Go-Ahead London trading name, although the individual company names are still applied beneath the logo.

Garages

Silvertown (SI)
As at May 2021, Docklands Buses operates routes 276, 300, 376 and D7.

Fleet
As at May 2015, Docklands Buses had a peak vehicle requirement of 76 buses.

References

External links

Docklands Buses website

Go-Ahead Group London bus operators
Transport in Epping Forest District
1988 establishments in England